Mount Walker West is a locality split between the Scenic Rim Region and City of Ipswich local government areas of Queensland, Australia.

Geography
Mount Walker West is in South East Queensland.

Along the eastern extent of Mount Walker West the Bremer River marks the boundary.

History
The locality takes its name from the mountain Mount Walker, which was originally named Mount Forbes by John Oxley on 22 September 1824 after Sir Francis Forbes, the Chief Justice of New South Wales. The name  was subsequently altered to Mount Walker, a shepherd called Walker  on the Franklyn Vale pastoral run.

At the  the locality and surrounds recorded a population of 392.

References

Scenic Rim Region
City of Ipswich
Localities in Queensland